Langona mediocris is a jumping spider that lives in Zimbabwe. The male was first identified by Wanda Wesołowska in 2000.

References

Endemic fauna of Zimbabwe
Salticidae
Spiders of Africa
Taxa named by Wanda Wesołowska
Spiders described in 2000